Clark Creek may refer to:

Clark Creek (Gasconade River), a river in Missouri
Clark Creek (Elkhorn River), a river in Nebraska
Clark Creek (Montana), a stream in Flathead County, Montana
Clark Creek (Susquehanna River), a river in Pennsylvania

See also
Clark Creek Natural Area, a state park in Mississippi
Clarke Creek, Queensland, a locality in Australia
Clarks Creek (disambiguation)